L'infedeltà delusa (Deceit Outwitted), Hob. 28/5, is an operatic burletta per musica in two acts by Joseph Haydn. The Italian libretto was by Marco Coltellini.

Performance history
The earliest recorded performance, which may have been the premiere, was at Eszterháza (in modern Hungary) on 26 July 1773. This was the name day of the Dowager Princess Estaházy and this date is given in the printed libretto. It was revived for the visit of Empress Maria Theresa on 1 September 1773, and again on 1 July 1774.
University of Kent in collaboration with Kent Opera staged the opera in English at the Gulbenkian Theatre in 1978, conducted by Harry Newstone and directed by Christopher Webber. In 2014, it was performed by New Chamber Opera at New College, Oxford.

Roles

Synopsis
The opera is set in the Tuscan countryside.

Act 1

Filippo, brother and sister Nanni and Vespina, and rich farmer Nencio admire the beauty of the summer evening. Filippo is concluding a deal with Nencio. Sandrina, Filippo's daughter enters, the others leave her alone with her father, who tells her that he has found her a husband. She protests that she loves only Nanni but Filippo dismisses the thought of her marrying a poor man. When Nanni arrives, Sandrina is sad, and torn between love for him and respect for her father. Nanni vows vengeance on Filippo and the man chosen to be Sandrina's husband.

In a room in Nanni and Vespina's house; Vespina sings of the pain of love but longs for its pleasures. She reveals that she is in love with Nencio, whose behaviour puzzles her. Nanni tells her that Nencio wishes to marry Sandrina and both swear vengeance.

Outside Filippo's house, Nencio sings a serenade to Sandrina. Vespina and Nanni eavesdrop on him as he asks Filippo to send Sandrina to him. Despite Sandrina's tears, Nencio says he will marry her come what may. Vespina enters and slaps him; Nencio and Filippo refuse to budge, Vespina and Nanni are furious while Sandrina laments her predicament.

Act 2

Vespina has disguised herself as an old woman, so that when Filippo and Sandrina come out of the house she will tell them that Nencio was secretly married but abandoned her daughter. Filippo, angry at Nencio's supposed duplicity hurls insults at him; Nencio, baffled by this, is next approached by Vespina this time disguised as a German servant who says that her master, a marquis will be taking Sandrina as his wife. Nencio thinks he now understands the reason for Filippo's anger, but Vespina reappears now as the Marquis de Ripafratta, saying that although he promised to marry Sandrina he wouldn't marry below his station and will therefore trick her into marrying one of his scullions. Nencio is pleased by the anticipated humiliation of Filippo and offers to be a witness. Vespina assures Nanni that her ruses will succeed.

Filippo is delighted by Sandrina's prospects as the wife of a marquis, but his daughter says that she wants love, not luxury. In her fourth disguise, Vespina enters as a notary accompanied by Nanni disguised as a servant and Nencio. A marriage contract is signed and witnessed, Filippo believing the bridegroom to be the marquis, Nencio thinking it the servant. When the disguises are thrown off, Sandrina is shown to be married to her beloved Nanni. Vespina confesses her tricks, Filippo accepts the outcome, and Vespina looks forward to wedding the chastened Nencio.

Orchestration
The opera is scored for two oboes, two bassoons, two horns, timpani, strings, continuo.

Recordings

 1968 – Emilia Ravaglia (Vespina), Elisabeth Speiser (Sandrina), Umberto Grilli (Filippo), Giorgio Grimaldi (Nencio), Robert El Hage (Nanni) – Orchestra of the Haydn Foundation, Rome, Antonio De Almeida – 3 LPs (Musical Heritage Society)
 1967 – Magda Kalmár (Vespina), Júlia Pászthy (Sandrina), István Rozsos (Filippo), Attila Fülöp (Nencio), József Gregor (Nanni) – Franz Liszt Chamber Orchestra, Frigyes Sándor – 2 CDs (Hungaroton)
 1981 – Edith Mathis (Vespina), Barbara Hendricks (Sandrina), Aldo Baldin (Filippo), Claes H. Ahnsjö (Nencio), Michael Devlin (Nanni) – Orchestre de Chambre de Lausanne, Antal Doráti – 2 CDs (Philips Records). This was recorded as part of the Haydn Eszterháza Opera Cycle on Philips
 1989 – Nancy Argenta (Vespina), Lena Lootens (Sandrina), Christoph Prégardien (Filippo), Markus Schäfer (Nencio), Stephen Varcoe (Nanni) – La Petite Bande, Sigiswald Kuijken – 2 CDs (Deutsche Harmonia Mundi)

References

External links
 

Operas
Italian-language operas
1773 operas
Operas by Joseph Haydn